Hacallı or Hacıalılı or Hajally or Hacalli may refer to:

Hacallı, Barda (disambiguation), several places in Azerbaijan
Hacallı (40° 14' N 47° 16' E), Barda, Azerbaijan
Hacallı (40° 27' N 47° 05' E), Barda, Azerbaijan
İkinci Hacallı, Azerbaijan
Hacallı, Goranboy, Azerbaijan
Hacallı, Tartar, Azerbaijan
Hacallı, Tovuz, Azerbaijan
Hacallı, Zangilan, Azerbaijan
Hacalıkənd, Azerbaijan

See also
Hacıalılı (disambiguation)